System Two, System II or System 2 may refer to:

Computing
 Acorn System 2, the early microcomputer
 Atari System 2, the arcade game platform by Atari 
 Apple System 2, the operating system version for the Apple Macintosh
 Capcom System 2, an arcade system board in the 1990s
 Cromemco System Two, a computer system by Cromemco from 1978
 Channel F System II, game console by Fairchild
 Digital Access Signalling System 2, the protocol by British Telecom
 Global File System 2, the file system by Red Hat
 Master System II, the 8-bit video game console by Sega
 Namco System 2, the arcade system board by Namco
 Sega System 2, an arcade system board in the 1990s
 S2 (programming language), style system 2

Other
System 2 in Trilogy, an album from rock band Angeldust
Super System 2, the poker system
System Shock 2, the computer game

See also
Operating System/2 by IBM
Personal System/2 by IBM